The Bellingham Sportsplex is an American multi-use sports facility located in Bellingham, Washington. The Sportsplex contains two turf fields, primarily used for indoor soccer, and an ice rink, used by local amateur ice hockey teams, figure skating lessons and performances, and home games for the Whatcom Soccer Academy Rapids soccer games and Western Washington University hockey teams.

References

External links
 Bellingham Sportsplex official site

Buildings and structures in Bellingham, Washington
Tourist attractions in Whatcom County, Washington